Jad Nicholas Abumrad (born April 18, 1973) is an American radio host, composer, and producer. He is the founder and former host  of the syndicated public radio program Radiolab with Latif Nasser and Lulu Miller.

Early life and education 
Abumrad was raised in Tennessee where his Lebanese father, Naji Abumrad, is a doctor at Vanderbilt University Medical Center and his mother is a scientist. Abumrad attended Oberlin College, where he studied creative writing and music composition with a special interest in electronic and electroacoustic music, receiving his B.A. in 1995.

Career
Before choosing radio as a career, Abumrad composed film scores.

Abumrad has reported and produced documentaries for a number of local and National Public Radio programs, including On the Media, PRI's Studio 360 with Kurt Andersen, Morning Edition, All Things Considered, Democracy Now!, and WNYC's "24 Hours at the Edge of Ground Zero".

Since 2002, Abumrad has produced and co-hosted the nationally syndicated program Radiolab. His background in music has influenced the sound of Radiolab. December 14, 2009 Radiolab episode In C includes a musical piece by Abumrad remixing the Terry Riley composition In C.

Abumrad was named a 2011 MacArthur Fellow; the foundation cited his "engaging audio explorations of scientific and philosophical questions" which "captivate listeners and bring to broadcast journalism a distinctive new aesthetic", while using "his background as a composer to orchestrate dialogue, music, and sound effects into compelling documentaries that draw listeners into investigations of otherwise intimidating topics."

Abumrad also produced and hosted The Ring & I, a look at the enduring power of Wagner's Ring Cycle. It aired nationally and internationally and earned ten awards, including the prestigious 2005 National Headliner Grand Award in Radio.

In 2016, Jad launched Radiolabs first ever spin-off series, More Perfect, a podcast that tells the stories behind the U.S. Supreme Court's most famous rulings.

In 2018 Abumrad hosted the four-part podcast series "UnErased," which tells the stories of survivors of gay conversion therapy. The podcast was co-created by the producers of the film Boy Erased, Kat Aaron and Shima Oliaee.

In 2019, Abumrad hosted the nine-episode podcast Dolly Parton's America, an in-depth exploration of the life, career, and enduring appeal of country music star and songwriter Dolly Parton. Abumrad and producer Shima Oliaee interviewed Parton extensively for the podcast. In addition to his journalistic access to her, he also has a familial connection: Parton and Jad's father, Naji, have been friends since Naji was her doctor in the aftermath of a minor car accident. The series won seven national awards, including a George Foster Peabody Award.

In January 2022, Abumrad announced his retirement from Radiolab, handing over the reins to producers Lulu Miller and Latif Nasser. In April 2022, Abumrad joined the faculty of Vanderbilt University. 

He is a Fellow of the New York Institute for the Humanities.

Personal life

In 2007, he married Karla Murthy, whom he met in college. Murthy works as a television producer. The couple have two children, and live in Fort Greene, Brooklyn.

References

External links 
 

1973 births
Living people
NPR personalities
American people of Lebanese descent
Oberlin College alumni
MacArthur Fellows